Christopher Spencer Foote (June 5, 1935 – June 13, 2005) was a professor of chemistry at UCLA and an expert in reactive oxygen species, in particular, singlet oxygen. He published 259 articles, editorials, and notes.  He was cited over 14,000 times with an average of 450 citations per year since 1989.  He has an h-index of 67.  He was also known for his textbook Organic Chemistry (with Brown and Iverson).

The American Chemical Society gave him their Baekeland award in 1975, named him a Cope Scholar in 1994, and gave him the Tolman Award in 1995. In 2000 an international symposium in honor of his 65th birthday was held in Hawaii. The Christopher S. Foote Chair of chemistry at UCLA, currently held by Neil Garg, is named after him.

Education
B.S. Yale University (1957)
Ph.D. Harvard University, Organic Chemistry, (1962)Research advisor, R.B. Woodward, "Angle strain and solvolytic reactivity in bridged bicyclic systems."

Research and Teaching Appointments
Assistant Professor, University of California, Los Angeles, 1962–1969
Professor, University of California, Los Angeles, 1969–2005

Research

Reactive oxygen species
Diels-Alder reaction with singlet oxygen, oxidative damage of DNA.

C70 and C60 as photosensitizers

References

1935 births
2005 deaths
20th-century American chemists
Yale University alumni
Harvard Graduate School of Arts and Sciences alumni
University of California, Los Angeles faculty